A switchblade is a type of knife. 

Switchblade may also refer to:

Aviation and military
 AeroVironment Switchblade, a small loitering munition unmanned aerial vehicle
 Northrop Grumman Switchblade, a proposed unmanned aerial vehicle, developed from 2006 to 2008
 Samson Switchblade, an American roadable aircraft design
 SS-N-25 'Switchblade', a version of the Kh-35 Russian anti-ship missile

Arts and entertainment

Music
 Switchblade (band), an Australian heavy metal band 
 Switchblade Symphony, an American band
 Strawberry Switchblade, a Scottish band
 Switchblade (album), an album by Schaft
 "Switchblade", an instrumental by Link Wray from his 1979 album Bullshot

Video games
 Razer Switchblade, a 2011 portable gaming device by Razer
 Switchblade (video game), a 1989 video game
 Switchblade II, a 1991 sequel

Other entertainment
 "Switchblade" (The Unit), an episode of the television series The Unit
 Jay White (born 1992), New Zealand-born professional wrestler known as "Switchblade"

Other uses
 SwitchBlade, a family of chassis network switches by Allied Telesis